"Travels with My Cats" is a fantasy/magic realism short story by Mike Resnick. It won the Hugo Award for Best Short Story  in 2005, was nominated for the Nebula Award in 2004.

Plot summary
Small town newspaper editor and failed novelist Ethan Owens leads a cautious, disappointing life, until he spends a few evenings with the long-dead author Priscilla Wallace, who wrote his favorite travel book, 'Travels with My Cats'.

When his only copy is destroyed at the end of the story, Ethan swears to find another and finds a new cause to go on in life.

Sources, references, external links, quotations

 Travels with My Cats can be read online at Asimov's Science Fiction: 
 An audio version is available at Escape Pod: 

2004 short stories
Short stories by Mike Resnick
Hugo Award for Best Short Story winning works
Works originally published in Asimov's Science Fiction